Kirktonecta is an extinct genus of microsaur known from the Carboniferous of West Lothian, Scotland.

Discovery
Kirktonecta is known from the holotype specimen UMZC 2002, a and b, an almost complete skeleton including the skull, and preserved evidence for soft tissues, in part (slab a) and counterpart (slab b). The holotype was collected in the East Kirkton Quarry, near Bathgate of West Lothian, from "Bed 82" East Kirkton Limestone of the Bathgate Hills Volcanic Formation, dating to the Brigantian substage, of the late Viséan stage, of the Dinantian series (Early Carboniferous), about 333–328.3 million years ago. It represents the first microsaur to be discovered in the United Kingdom and the earliest occurrence of a microsaur in the fossil record. The next oldest being Utaherpeton and an unnamed taxon from the Chesterian of Goreville, Illinois.

Description
Jennifer A. Clack, who named this genus, found it to be most closely related to basal microsaurs, such as Asaphestera, Saxonerpeton, Hyloplesion and Llistrofus.

Etymology
Kirktonecta was first named by Jennifer A. Clack in 2011 and the type species is Kirktonecta milnerae. The generic name is derived from the name of the East Kirkton Quarry, where the holotype was found, and Greek necta, "swimmer". The specific name honours the paleontologist Angela C. Milner.

References

Carboniferous amphibians of Europe
Carboniferous reptiliomorphs
Fossil taxa described in 2011